The Archivo General de Puerto Rico (General Archives of Puerto Rico), established in 1955, is an archive documenting the history and culture of Puerto Rico. The governmental Institute of Puerto Rican Culture began overseeing its operation in 1956. It is located in a building shared with the national library on Avenida Juan Ponce de León in San Juan. Among its collections is the "Fondo de Obras Publicas" (records of public works), formerly housed in the University of Puerto Rico's archives.

The objectives of this institution, which is managed by volunteers, and spearheaded by Joseph Harrison Flores, is to make information accessible quickly and in a democratic way.

Collections

Audio
The Archivo de Música y Sonido (audio department) includes:
 Jesús Maria Sanromá collection
 Monserrate Deliz collection
 Antonio Otero collection
 Ramos Antonini collection
 Robert L. Junghanns collection, with phonograph cylinders
 José Llombart collection
 Oscar Hernández collection
 Bruce Bastin collection

Film
The Archivo de Imágenes en Movimiento (film department) includes:
 Materials related to cinema of Puerto Rico, including film productions  Maruja, El Otro Camino
 Mirador Puertorriqueño collection; related to WIPR-TV
 Administración de Fomento Económico collection, related to government department of economic development, governor Luis A. Ferré administration
 Instituto de Cultura Puertorriqueña collection
 Municipio de San Juan collection, of San Juan government
 Kresto y Denia collection; related to firms Cine Productions,  Noticiero Viguié
 División de Educación de la Comunidad collection, including governmental Comisión de Recreo y Deportes Públicos (recreation commission) and Departamento de Instrucción Pública (public instruction department)

Photographs
The Archivo Fotográfico (photo department) includes:
 Puerto Rico Department of Education
 Felisa Rincón de Gautier
 Instituto de Cultura Puertorriqueña
 Antonio Mirabal collection, related to Ponce
 Photo albums of López Cepero, Feliciano Alonso
 Gertrude Baynham collection
 Resident Commissioner of Puerto Rico
 Guy Vernor Henry collection
 Postcard collection

See also
 General Archives of Puerto Rico
 Portal de Archivos Españoles (federated search of archives in Spain)

References

Bibliography

External links

 Official site (in Spanish)
 Archivo Digital Nacional de Puerto Rico

1955 establishments in Puerto Rico
puerto rico
History of Puerto Rico
Puerto Rican culture
Organizations based in Puerto Rico
Archives
San Juan, Puerto Rico
Libraries in Puerto Rico